The 2015 Boise mayoral election was held on November 3, 2015, to determine the mayor of Boise, Idaho. The election was officially nonpartisan.

Background
Bieter was initially regarded as the strongly favored candidate, as he was seeking a fourth term and had won by a three-to-one margin in the 2011 election. Sven Berg, writing for the Idaho Statesman, wrote in September 2015 that "There might be a current of dissatisfaction with Bieter running through parts of Boise, but come election time, it hasn’t yet showed up in the votes. Beating him will take a lot of work."

Results

References

Boise
Mayoral elections in Boise, Idaho
History of Boise, Idaho
Government of Boise, Idaho
Boise